Pterocarya stenoptera, the Chinese wingnut, is a small-winged wingnut tree of the Juglandaceae family.  It is originally from Southeast China.

Description 

Pterocarya stenoptera is quite similar to P. fraxinifolia.   The major difference lies in the shape of the wings on the fruit:  reminiscent of the wings of the common fly, they are connected to the two sides of the walnut shaped fruit, which is about the size of a chickpea.  The wings lie in two different planes.

The fruits develop in the summer on 25 cm long catkins, hanging from the distinctly differently textured green foliage.  The fruiting catkins are frequently considered desirable from a landscaping perspective.

The foliage is dense, though it can be thinned by pruning. The alternate deciduous leaves are pinnately compound, bearing odd numbers of elliptic-oblong pinnately-veined leaflets with serrate margins.  The bark on the trunk is similar to P. fraxinifolia, but is smoother.

The tree grows rapidly under optimal conditions, easily reaching 70 feet with substantial spreading branches.  One tree in Raleigh grew to 25 feet in only six years, with a trunk diameter of fourteen inches.  Trunk diameters as large as eight feet have been reported.  The USDA rates this tree as being appropriate in zones 6B - 11.

Distribution and habitat 
Forests on mountain slopes or riverbanks; near sea level to 1500 m. Anhui, Fujian, Gansu, Guangdong, Guangxi, Guizhou, Hainan, Hebei, Henan, Hubei, Hunan, Jiangsu, Jiangxi, Liaoning, Shaanxi, Shandong, Shanxi, Sichuan, Taiwan, Yunnan, Zhejiang, Japan, Korea.

Ecology 
Pterocarya stenoptera propagates readily from seed that has received approximately three months of cold moist stratification.  Germination is epigeal and typically requires a little more than ten days.  The first true (pinnately compound) leaves appear after the seedling reaches a height of ~6 cm.  The young seedlings do well under half-shade and a temperature of ~18 °C (64 °F).

Pterocarya stenoptera can also be propagated by cuttings.

Uses 
Used in East Asian classical garden design.

Notes

References 

stenoptera